Double Island may refer to:

 Double Island, Queensland, near Cairns, Queensland, Australia
 Double Island (Shark Bay) in Western Australia
 Mayu Island and Dezhou Island in Shantou, China, known as Double Island in 19th-century English-language sources
 Double Island, Hong Kong, in northeastern New Territories, Hong Kong
 Double Island (Washington), one of the San Juan Islands
 Double Island (New Zealand), one of the Mercury Islands in New Zealand
 Double Island, Ontario, in Ontario, Canada.

References